Asaphodes oraria is a species of moth in the family Geometridae. This species is endemic to New Zealand and has been observed in the southern South Island and on Stewart Island / Rakiura. The male is pale yellow coloured and the female has severely reduced wings and is flightless. The habitat of this species is tussock grasslands on coastal sand dunes and in the mountains at elevations of approximately 4,000ft. The larvae have adapted to feeding on exotic lawn daisy species in the genus Bellis. The adults of this species are on the wing from November to April.

Taxonomy 
This species was described by Alfred Philpott in 1903 and named Xanthorhoe oraria. George Hudson discussed and illustrated this species under the name Xanthorhoe oraria in his 1928 publication The Butterflies and Moths of New Zealand. In 1939 Louis Beethoven Prout placed this species in the genus Larentia. This placement was not accepted by New Zealand taxonomists. In 1971 J. S. Dugdale placed this species within the genus Asaphodes. Dugdale confirmed this placement in 1988. The male holotype, collected at New River, Invercargill, is held at the New Zealand Arthropod Collection.

Description

Philpott described this species as follows:
The female of the species is semi-apterous and is flightless.

Distribution 

This species is endemic to New Zealand. This species has been observed in the South Island and Stewart Island including at the type locality of Invercargill, Ben Lomond and Mount Earnslaw / Pikirakatahi in Otago.

Behaviour 
The adults of this species are on the wing from November to April.

Habitat
This species inhabits tussock grass on coastal sand dunes and hills. It has also been found in mountainous tussock grass habitat at elevations of approximately 4,000 ft.

Host species 
Larvae have been raised on, and has also been observed in the wild feeding on, introduced lawn daisy species within the genus Bellis including Bellis perennis. It has been hypothesised that the native hosts of the larvae of this species are forest floor, wetland, coastal and inter-tussock herbs.

References 

Larentiinae
Moths described in 1903
Moths of New Zealand
Endemic fauna of New Zealand
Taxa named by Alfred Philpott
Endemic moths of New Zealand